The 1998 Kansas City Wizards season was the third MLS history. Played at Arrowhead Stadium in Kansas City, Missouri. MLS did not allow matches to end in ties in 1998 and thus Shootouts were used to decide draws, the stats that follow do not include shootout goals scored and the teams actually point total in the regular season was 32 even though it is shown below as 36. Shootout win= 1 point, Shootout loss= 0 points.

Squad

Competitions

Major League Soccer

U.S. Open Cup

Squad statistics

Final Statistics

References

1998
Kansas City Wizards
Kansas City Wizards